Kathleen Garretson (born May 15, 1963) is an American television director, producer and podcaster. Garretson has directed episodes of the sitcoms Frasier, 2 Broke Girls, Fuller House and the season one finale of the Punky Brewster reboot in 2021, among others, as well as producing Hallmark's Garage Sale Mystery movies. She received the Frank Capra Lifetime Achievement Award from the Directors Guild of America (DGA) in 2012. Garretson also hosted the hit podcast "Mojo Girl Madness."

Early life
Kathleen Garretson was born in Nuremberg, West Germany, where her father, a Captain in the U.S. Air Force, was stationed. Her parents were John Thomas Garretson, of Tucson, Arizona, where he earned his business degree from the University of Arizona, and Elinor Van Haltern, from Dallas, Texas, and a graduate of Southern Methodist University (SMU). Garretson is a graduate of the University of Southern California in Los Angeles, earning degrees in both Journalism and Business Communications. At USC, Garretson was a member of the Delta Delta Delta sorority, and was an award-winning member of the USC Speech & Debate Team. She became interested in the film industry while working at her college job as a tour guide at Universal Studios.

Career
A TV director and a professor of directing at the University of Southern California School of Cinematic Arts, Garretson has had a long career in entertainment. Following graduation from the University of Southern California, and a brief run as a production assistant and stand-in, Garretson was accepted into the Directors Guild of America training program. Following a two-year trainee period, she then fully joined the DGA as an assistant director. During her first few years as a DGA member, Garretson worked mainly on made-for-TV films and feature films. Her credits include the feature films Star Trek VI: The Undiscovered Country, Clifford, Switch and The Specialist.

Garretson continued to work as an assistant director on "movies of the week", features and commercials for several years, until she was hired to be an assistant director on the sitcom Frasier. She slowly segued out of being an AD on "single-camera" productions as her credit list on "multi-camera" shows grew. Garretson then made her directorial debut during Frasier's sixth season. She was nominated for a Directors Guild of America Award for "Best Comedy Director of 1999" for her first directing assignment. She continued to direct episodes of Frasier until the show's end in 2004. Her other directing credits include the new Punky Brewster reboot for Peacock, Carol's Second Act with Patricia Heaton, Broke with Pauley Perrette, The Cool Kids, Alexa & Katie, Fuller House, 2 Broke Girls, The Odd Couple, One Big Happy, Young & Hungry, Sullivan & Son, Titus, Reba, Girlfriends, George Lopez, Freddie, One on One, True Jackson, VP and the animated series Sid the Science Kid.

In January 2012, Garretson was awarded the Frank Capra Lifetime Achievement Award from the DGA. She was the 26th recipient of this award since the Guild was founded, and it was presented to her by director Michael Apted. Garretson served as an Associate National Board member and three-term Council Chair at the DGA, and on numerous guild committees. She currently serves the Directors Guild of America as a member of the PAC Leadership Committee, the Frank Capra Award Committee, and the Western Directors Council Ethics Committee.

Garretson took a three-year hiatus from directing from early-2012 through 2014 to serve as the CEO/Executive Director of the non-profit I Have A Dream Foundation - Los Angeles. She had been a mentor and volunteer with the organization for many years, and was asked to oversee a rebuilding and revitalization of the foundation. This was accomplished by the end of 2014, and Garretson returned to her creative roots in film and television production.

Garretson is also a television producer, and in 2011-12, found, developed and was the supervising producer on a TV movie, Garage Sale Mystery, for Hallmark Channel. This movie, which aired in September 2013, broke nearly every ratings record for the Hallmark Channel, and in March 2014, Hallmark announced it would re-brand its movie channel to be the Hallmark Movies & Mysteries Channel, and would have a "wheel" of mystery movies led by new Garage Sale Mysteries. Fifteen Garage Sale Mysteries have aired and four new ones were scheduled to air in August, 2019, however midway through shooting of the seventeenth GSM, the star was indicted in the college admissions scandal and the movie series was cancelled by Hallmark.

Garretson has long been active in the Directors Guild of America and the Academy of Television Arts & Sciences, speaking on numerous panels and seminars. She has also taught classes on sitcom directing at the American Film Institute in Los Angeles and has been a guest speaker for multiple courses at both the USC School of Cinematic Arts, where she now teaches a graduate course on directing, and the Screenwriting Program at UCLA. Additionally, Garretson has remained active as an alumna of USC. She served on the inaugural Alumni Board of Directors for the Annenberg School of Journalism and Communications, and is a booster and avid fan of USC Trojan Football.

Filmography

Film

Television

References

External links
 
 

American television directors
American television producers
American women television directors
American women television producers
Living people
USC Annenberg School for Communication and Journalism alumni
People from California
1963 births
21st-century American women